Ramana is an Indian actor and producer who has appeared in Tamil and Telugu films in leading and supporting roles. He is the son of Tamil actor Vijay Babu who is known for the role of Rajinikanth's younger brother in Padikkadavan. He is the wicket keeper for the team Chennai Rhinos in Celebrity Cricket League. He is credited as Srinath in Telugu films.

Career
Ramana was initially meant to make his acting debut through the film Kurunji by debutant Pari, which he shot for alongside actress Uma. However, the film eventually did not complete production. Ramana made his debut in the films with the Tamil film  Style released in the year 2002; though he is active in the industry since 1999. Ramana’s first Telugu film was Utsaham released in the year 2003. Followed by the romantic comedy film Fools directed by Dasari Narayana Rao.  Later, he collaborates in the movies Sankharavam with Anant Nag and Sarath Babu followed by Puttintiki Ra Chelli (2004) starring Arjun Sarja.He is also in the cast with the together both Sathyaraj and Sibiraj in the movie Jore (2004). Ramana (who played the villain in (Jore) along with Kutty Radhika (she debuted in Iyarkai) play the lead in Meesai Madhavan (2004), remake of successful Malayalam film Kabooliwala. In 2005, he acted in the main roles as Ayodhya,  Rightaa Thappaa and Andha Naal Nyabagam.

Ramana debuting into Mollywood in the comedy movie Gopalapuranam appearing with Mukesh. He is a young hero with lots of potential. Unfortunately both his films have bombed at the box office.SSS Good luck films produces Ezhuthiyatharadi (2008) with Ramana the hero playing a lead role. The action movie Nayagan (2008) was inspired from the English thriller Cellular based on which a Hindi movie  Speed had released about this time last year. Later, Ramana impresses with his cold villainy in Thunichal (2010) starring Arun Vijay. He appeared in the lead role in the latest release of 2011 Mahaan Kanakku which is considered to be impressive. His next films was Karu Palaniappan’s Jannal Oram (2013) and Magizh Thirumeni’s Meaghamann (2014).He starred in the supporting cast in the Lokesh Kanagaraj’s Kaithi (2019).

Ramana and Nandha, close friends of the actors, have started a film company called Rana Productions, which produced the hit show Sun Naam Oruvar starring Vishal on Sun TV. Then, he acted in the bilingual horror film Mane Number 13 (2020) who was shot in Kannada and Tamil released on Amazon Prime Video. He produced his first movie and performs as a negative role in the action thriller Laththi (2022) starring Vishal.

Filmography

As actor

Producer

Rana Event

Rana Productions

References

External links 

Indian male film actors
Male actors in Tamil cinema
Living people
Male actors in Telugu cinema
1979 births